Heyuan Subdistrict is a subdistrict in western Hongqiao District, Tianjin, China. It borders Xiyingmen SUbdistrict to its north and south, Xigu and Shaogongzhuang Subdistricts to its east, Zhongbei Town to its southwest, and Yangliuqing Town to its west.

The subdistrict was created in 2015. The subdistrict's name can be literally translated as "Peace Garden".

Administrative divisions 
In 2021, Heyuan Subdistrict consisted of 7 residential communities, all of which can be seen in the list below:

See also 

 List of township-level divisions of Tianjin

References 

Township-level divisions of Tianjin
Hongqiao District, Tianjin